Richard Tauber (16 May 1891 – 8 January 1948) was an Austrian tenor and film actor.

Early life
Richard Tauber was born in Linz, Austria, to Elisabeth Seifferth (née Denemy), a widow and an actress who played soubrette roles at the local theatre, and Richard Anton Tauber, an actor; his parents were not married and his father was reportedly unaware of the birth as he was touring North America at the time. The child was given the name Richard Denemy; he was sometimes known as [Carl] Richard Tauber, and also used his mother's married name, Seiffert; but the claim by the Encyclopædia Britannica that he was ever known as Ernst Seiffert has no support from any of the 12 published books and monographs about him listed in Daniel O'Hara's comprehensive Richard Tauber Chronology. After he was adopted by his father in 1913, his legal name became Richard Denemy-Tauber.

Tauber accompanied his mother on tour to theatres, but she found it increasingly difficult to cope, and left him with foster-parents in Urfahr, now a suburb of Linz. In 1897–98 he was sent to school in Linz, and then his father took over his upbringing, moving him to Graz, Prague, Berlin, Salzburg and finally Wiesbaden. His father, who was born Jewish, but had converted to Roman Catholicism, hoped that young Tauber would become a priest. The boy missed the excitement of the theatre and instead joined his father in Prague and, subsequently, in 1903 at the theatre in Wiesbaden. Tauber hoped to become a singer but failed to impress any of the teachers he auditioned for, probably because he chose to sing Wagner, for which his voice was not suited. His father entered him at the Hoch Conservatory in Frankfurt to study piano, composition and conducting. He made rapid progress but he still hoped to become a singer.

Early career
After an intense period of vocal training under Carl Beines, he made his public debut at a concert at Freiburg on 17 May 1912. That year his father was appointed Intendant of the Municipal Theatre in Chemnitz and was therefore in a position to arrange for Tauber to appear as Tamino in The Magic Flute on 2 March 1913. The Count encouraged Tauber to take small roles with other companies to broaden his experience. During his years in Dresden, Tauber acquired his reputation as a remarkably quick student: he learned Gounod's Faust in 48 hours, Bacchus in Richard Strauss's Ariadne auf Naxos overnight, to the amazement of the composer, who conducted the performance (in Berlin). People started to call him "the SOS Tenor". He saved the German premiere of Puccini's Turandot in 1926 at the Staatsoper Dresden, learning the role of Calaf in three days when tenor Curt Taucher fell ill.

Following some guest appearances at the Wiener Volksoper in 1920, he made his Vienna State Opera debut on 16 June in La bohème, substituting for an indisposed Alfred Piccaver. In 1922, Tauber signed a five-year contract with the Vienna State Opera and appearances with the Berlin State Opera followed; for many years he appeared with both companies – four months with each, leaving four months for concerts and guest appearances with other companies and touring abroad. He sang the tenor role in many operas, including Don Giovanni, The Bartered Bride, Tosca, Mignon, Faust, Carmen and Die Fledermaus, as well as newer works such as Erich Korngold's Die tote Stadt and Wilhelm Kienzl's Der Evangelimann. Daniel O'Hara's Tauber Chronology lists 100 roles in opera and operetta that he performed on stage. It was in June 1919 that he made the first of over seven hundred gramophone records. All his vocal recordings were made for the Odeon Records label, and after 1933 for the associated Parlophone label. Tauber had a lyrical, flexible tenor voice, and he sang with a warm, elegant legato. His excellent breath control gave him a wonderful head voice and messa di voce with a superb pianissimo. He was elegant in appearance too – although he had a slight squint in his right eye; he disguised it by wearing a monocle which, when accompanied by a top hat, added to the elegant effect.

Tauber first performed in an operetta by Franz Lehár at the Volksbühne in Berlin in 1920. This was Zigeunerliebe, in which he also appeared in Linz and Salzburg in 1921. In 1922 he was offered the role of Armand in Lehár's  at the Theater an der Wien, and the experience was a resounding success. This excursion into operetta was looked down on by some, but did Tauber no harm. It gave him a new audience. It revived Lehár's flagging career as a composer of operetta. In the future, Lehár composed a number of operettas with roles written specifically for Richard Tauber, including Paganini (1925, although he was unavailable for the Vienna premiere, and first sang it in Berlin in 1926), Der Zarewitsch (1927), Friederike (1928), The Land of Smiles (1929) with the famous aria "Dein ist mein ganzes Herz", Schön ist die Welt (1930), and Giuditta (1934). The hit songs usually occurred in the second act and were informally known as Tauberlieder. Tauber appeared in a number of films, both in Germany and later in England. He provided a 'voice-over', singing the title song in the otherwise silent film I Kiss Your Hand, Madame (1929).

When in Vienna, Tauber also conducted at the Theater an der Wien, and it was here in 1924 that he met the soprano Carlotta Vanconti who soon divorced her Italian husband and married Tauber on 18 March 1926. They separated in 1928 and divorced later the same year in Berlin. The divorce was recognised, however, only in Germany. In 1929 he met Mary Losseff at Rudolf Nelson's review in Berlin. They lived together for about five years. Losseff became his muse; it was for her that he wrote Der singende Traum. Losseff's career ended when she became an alcoholic, but Tauber remained her lifelong friend and supported her until his death. In 1931, Tauber made his London debut in operetta, and London appearances became a regular event; he also toured the United States in this year. In 1933, Tauber was assaulted in the street by a group of Nazi Brownshirts because of his Jewish ancestry, and he decided to leave Germany for his native Austria, where he continued to sing at the Vienna State Opera right up to the Anschluss in March 1938. In the mid-1930s, he made several musical films in England, and at the premiere of her film Mimi in April 1935, he met the English actress Diana Napier (1905–1982); they were married on 20 June 1936, only after protracted legal proceedings to secure an Austrian divorce from Vanconti. Napier appeared in three of his British films: Heart's Desire (1935), Land Without Music and Pagliacci (both 1936).

Later career
In 1938, he made his London operatic debut in Die Zauberflöte under Sir Thomas Beecham. Earlier that year, the Nazi government of Germany annexed Austria and Tauber left for good. In response, the Nazis withdrew the Taubers' passports and right of abode; because this left the couple technically stateless, Tauber applied for British citizenship. He was touring South Africa when World War II broke out, and returned to Switzerland until receiving the papers allowing him to enter the UK in March 1940.

Despite receiving lucrative offers from the United States, he remained in the UK for the entire war. There was little opera staged in wartime Britain so he made a living by singing, conducting and making gramophone records and radio broadcasts. He even composed English operettas, together with the lyric writer Fred S. Tysh, from one of which, Old Chelsea, the song "My Heart and I" became one of his most popular English recordings. It was only these English records that brought him any royalties; for his earlier recordings he had been paid for each performance and he had been compelled to leave his savings behind in Austria. By now he was so crippled by arthritis that he could no longer move into and away from the microphone for softer and louder notes. A small trolley was built on rubber wheels so the engineers could silently roll him back and forth while recording.

In 1946, Tauber appeared in a Broadway adaptation of The Land of Smiles (Yours is my Heart) which flopped, leaving him with huge personal losses and in debt to the backers. He was thus forced to tour the United States, Canada, Central and South America for six months to recoup losses, with Arpad Sandor and George Schick serving as his accompanists, and Neil Chotem as assisting artist. In April 1947, Tauber returned to London and sought medical attention for a persistent cough. He was eventually diagnosed with lung cancer: one lung was already useless and the other nearly so.

The Vienna State Opera was in London for a short season at the Royal Opera House – their first visit since the war – and they invited Tauber to sing one performance with his old company. On 27 September 1947 he sang the role of Don Ottavio in Don Giovanni, not a large part but with two difficult arias that demand good breath control to bring off well. Those in the audience say that he sang wonderfully and to loud applause. Live excerpts of these two arias from this performance survive, and they reveal a tone of undiminished focus and steadiness, a good line, and somewhat shortened phrasing.

Death
Three days after his last performance, Tauber entered Guy's Hospital on October 1, 1947, to have his left lung removed to treat the cancer. Nonetheless, he died of complications on January 8, 1948, in the London Clinic, Devonshire Place. His Requiem Mass was at St. James' Church, Spanish Place. He was interred in Brompton Cemetery in London.

Selected discography
Tauber made over 720 vocal recordings for the Odeon/Parlophone companies, plus several as an orchestral conductor, mainly of his own works, but also of music by Grieg and Johann Strauss, Jr. Of the 120 acoustic recordings, the most important are of arias by Mozart, Tchaikovsky and Kienzl, and songs by Schumann, Richard Strauss and Grieg. There are also five duets with Elisabeth Rethberg, arias by Verdi, Puccini etc., and excerpts from Korngold's Die tote Stadt, including a duet with Lotte Lehmann. Among the electrical recordings, there are albums of German folksongs, and 12 songs from Schubert's Winterreise, accompanied by Mischa Spoliansky, and an album of folksongs by Franz Gabriel and Hermann Löns. Perhaps most prized are the four Mozart arias recorded in 1938 and 1939, and the aria from Der Freischütz made in 1946. Among his last recordings are two songs by Richard Strauss, accompanied at the piano by Percy Kahn. In his lifetime, his many recordings of music by Franz Lehár, much of it written for him, and his own songs from the operetta Old Chelsea (1942) were best sellers, along with a huge range of lighter and popular music in German and English. A number of his broadcasts have been preserved, including a series of General Motors Concerts from America in 1937, a Radio Hilversum concert of 1939, and excerpts from his three series of weekly programmes for the BBC (1945–47).

Selected filmography
 Reise-Abenteuer (1925) [short silent]
 Achtung! Aufnahme! (1927) [short silent]
 I Kiss Your Hand, Madame (1929)
 Never Trust a Woman (1930, Ich glaub' nie mehr an eine Frau)
 End of the Rainbow (1930, Das lockende Ziel)
 The Land of Smiles (1930)
 The Big Attraction (1931, Die große Attraktion)
 Melody of Love (1932, Melodie der Liebe)
 Blossom Time (1934)
 Heart's Desire (1935)
 Land Without Music (1936)
 Pagliacci (1936)
 Waltz Time (1945)
 Lisbon Story (1946)

References

External links

Das Richard Tauber Archiv  This site also hosts a regularly updated chronology in English by Daniel O'Hara. 
Greatest Singer?
Richard Tauber: A Brief Appreciation
Richard Tauber in Australia
Photographs of Richard Tauber

 "History of the Tenor": Richard Tauber, sound clips and narration, Sydney R. Barker

1891 births
1948 deaths
Musicians from Linz
Jewish emigrants from Austria to the United Kingdom after the Anschluss
Austrian operatic tenors
Jewish opera singers
Burials at Brompton Cemetery
Hoch Conservatory alumni
Fonotipia Records artists
Austrian Roman Catholics
Deaths from lung cancer in England
20th-century Austrian male opera singers